The Bitola revolutionary district (Macedonian/Bulgarian: Битолски револуционерен округ) was an organizational grouping of the Bulgarian Macedonian-Adrianople Revolutionary Committees, and its successors, the Secret Macedonian-Adrianople Revolutionary Organization and the Internal Macedonian-Adrianople Revolutionary Organization. The most famous leaders of the group were Petar Naumov Toshev and Georgi Petrov Nikolov. This rebel group was active in Aegean Macedonia and Vardar Macedonia with headquarters in Bitola.

Bitola